is a train station located in Imari City, Saga Prefecture, Japan. It is a transfer station between the JR Kyushu Chikuhi Line and the third-sector Matsuura Railway Nishi-Kyushu Line.

Lines 

Layout
The station was once a through-station but the tracks JR and Matsuura tracks have since been divided. Each company now occupies separate premises with a road in between the two. The JR station consists of a bay platform serving a single track. The Matsuura station consists of three bay platforms serving three tracks, with several sidings branching off. There is no through-track at either station.

The JR station building, to the east, houses a waiting area and a ticket window. Management of the station has been outsourced to the JR Kyushu Tetsudou Eigyou Co., a wholly owned subsidiary of JR Kyushu specialising in station services. It staffs the ticket window which is equipped with a Midori no Madoguchi facility.

The Matsuura Railway station building is larger and houses a waiting area, a Matsuura ticket window, a cafe and shop.  A link bridge runs above the road, connecting the two station buildings.

Adjacent stations 

|-
|colspan=5|JR Kyushu

|-
|colspan=5|Matsuura Railway

History
The Imari Railway merged with the Kyushu Railway on 28 December the same year. The Kyushu Railway was nationalized on 1 July 1907 and Japanese Government Railways (JGR) took over control of the station. On 12 October 1909, the line serving the station was designated the Imari Line.

The Kitakyushu Railway was nationalised on 1 October 1937 and JGR  designated this track the Chikuhi Line. On 1 March 1945, the track from Arita to Imari was designated as part of the Matsuura Line. With the privatization of Japanese National Railways (JNR), the successor of JGR, on 1 April 1987, control of the station passed to JR Kyushu. On 1 April 1988, the Matsuura Line was divested to the third-sector Matsuura Railway and the line was renamed the Nishi-Kyushu Line.

Passenger statistics
For the JR station, in fiscal 2015, there were a total of 71,894 boarding passengers, giving a daily average of 197 passengers.

For the Matsuura Railway station, in fiscal 2015, there were a total of 207,497 boarding passengers, giving a daily average of 568 passengers.

See also
 List of railway stations in Japan

References

External links 

Imari Station (JR Kyushu)

Railway stations in Japan opened in 1898
Railway stations in Saga Prefecture